Duddon and Burton is a civil parish in the unitary authority of Cheshire West and Chester and the ceremonial county of Cheshire, England.  The parish is formed of the villages of Duddon and Burton.

Location

Governance
The parish currently falls within the unitary authority of Cheshire West and Chester and within the Westminster constituency of Eddisbury.

Until 1 April 2015, Duddon and Burton were separate civil parishes. However Burton had neither a parish council nor a parish meeting, and, consequently, the duties that would normally be performed by these bodies were the responsibility of Cheshire West and Chester Council.

From 1 April 2015, Burton parish was merged with Duddon parish to create a new, larger parish. On 1 July 2017 the new parish was renamed to Duddon and Burton.

See also

Listed buildings in Burton (near Tarporley)
Listed buildings in Duddon

References

External links

Duddon & Burton Parish Council website

Civil parishes in Cheshire
Cheshire West and Chester